José María Sacristán Turiégano (born 27 September 1937), better known as José Sacristán, is a Spanish film, theatre, and television actor.

At Gijón International Film Festival in 2015, he received the Nacho Martinez Award.

At the 60th San Sebastian International Film Festival in 2013 he received the Silver Shell for Best Actor.

Filmography as director
He has directed three films: 
 Yo me bajo en la próxima, ¿y usted? (1992)
 Cara de acelga (1987)
 Soldados de plomo (1983)

Selected filmography as actor

Television
Alta mar/High seas, Netflix, 2019-2020
Morocco: Love in Times of War, Antena 3, 2017
Velvet, Antena 3/Netflix, 2014-2016

Films

The Bar (2017)
Perdiendo el Norte (2015)
Magical Girl (2014)
El muerto y ser feliz (2012)
Madrid, 1987 (2011)
Cosas que hacen que la vida valga la pena (2004)
Roma (2004)
Fumata blanca (2002)
La marcha verde (2001)
Ja me maaten (2000)
Martín (hache) (1997)
7000 Días Juntos (1995)
Convivencia (1993)
Todos a la cárcel (1993)
Madregilda (1993)
El pájaro de la felicidad (1993)
Historias de la puta mili (1993)
Un lugar en el mundo (1992)
Yo me bajo en la próxima, ¿y usted? (1992)
El vuelo de la paloma (1989)
El viaje a ninguna parte (1986)
A la pálida luz de la luna (1985)
La vaquilla (1985)
La noche más hermosa (1984)
Epílogo (1984)
Soldados de plomo (1983) (also director)
La colmena (1982)
Navajeros (1980)
Operación Ogro (1979)
Miedo a salir de noche (1979)
Mis relaciones con Ana (1979)
¡Arriba Hazaña! (1978)
Un hombre llamado flor de otoño (1978)
Solos en la madrugada (1978)
El diputado (1978)
Oro rojo (1978)
Reina Zanahoria (1977)
Asignatura pendiente (1977)
Parranda (1977)
Hasta que el matrimonio nos separe (1976)
Ellas los prefieren...locas (1976)
Las largas vacaciones del 36 (1976)
El secreto inconfesable de un chico bien (1975)
La mujer es cosa de hombres (1975)
Lo verde empieza en los Pirineos (1975)
No quiero perder la honra (1975)
Los nuevos españoles (1975)
Mi mujer es muy decente, dentro de lo que cabe (1974)
Vida conyugal sana (1974)
 Pasqualino Cammarata, Frigate Captain (1974)
Sex o no sex (1974)
El abuelo tiene un plan (1973)
Señora doctor (1973)
Las estrellas están verdes (1973)
El padre de la criatura (1972)
París Bien Vale una Moza (1972)
Guapo heredero busca esposa (1972)
Vente a Alemania, Pepe (1971)
Vente a ligar al Oeste (1971)
No desearás a la mujer del vecino (1971)
Las ibéricas F.C. (1971)
Españolas en París (1971)
The Man Who Wanted to Kill Himself (1970)
El apartamento de la tentación (1971)
Pierna creciente, falda menguante (1970)
Cateto a babor (1970)
The Complete Idiot (1970)
Don Erre que Erre (1970)
Una señora llamada Andrés (1970)
El ángel (1969)
Sangre en el ruedo (1969)
The Troublemaker (1969)
Soltera y madre en la vida (1969)
Relaciones casi públicas (1968)
¡Cómo está el servicio! (1968)
Operation Mata Hari (1968) 
Sor Citroën (1967)
La ciudad no es para mí (1965)

References

External links

1937 births
Living people
Male actors from Madrid
Spanish male film actors
Spanish film directors
20th-century Spanish male actors
21st-century Spanish male actors